Stella Marconi is an English alternative rock and indie band, based in Manchester, currently having four members; James Bagshaw (Guitar/Vocals), Andrew Smith (Bass/Vocals), Caitlin Lyons (Guitar/Vocals) and Dave Widdowson (Drums). The band has had local success and in surrounding areas, but with an ever-growing list of appearances and the rising popularity of their songs, their popularity has reached nationwide.

Career
Stella Marconi formed in November 2009, the original members being James Bagshaw, Andrew Smith, when James and Andrew discovered they shared a love for music. The band's initial performances included several notable Manchester locations including Manchester Academy. The band's first EP, "Aeroplane Blonde", was released in 2010 at a performance at Jabez Clegg as a free download and free physical distribution on iTunes.

On 30 September and 1 October, the band hosted the Inaugural UK shows of New York-based band The Indecent at Manchester Academy and O2 Academy Islington, London, alongside Kirsty Almeida. Shortly after, Stella Marconi released their second EP 'Beware Of False Prophets' as a free online download on their SoundCloud Page.

On 10 September 2012, the band independently released their debut album, STOP: Await Instructions.

Members
 James Bagshaw - Guitar/Vocals
 Andrew Smith - Bass/Vocals
 Caitlin Lyons - Guitar/Vocals
 David Widdowson - Drums/Percussion

References

Musical groups from Manchester